was a Kunoichi (female ninja) who is thought to have served the Takeda clan. 竊奸秘伝書, the 13 meters long ninjutsu scroll handed down in Matsushiro Domain introduced her as the founder of this school of ninja. Sanada clan, the daimyō of Matsusiro domain was former retainer of Takeda clan and Umemura Sawano worked for him.

References

16th-century Japanese people
Japanese ninjutsu practitioners
Ninja
Women of medieval Japan
16th-century Japanese women
Women in 16th-century warfare
Women in 15th-century warfare
Japanese women in warfare
Women in 17th-century warfare
Female wartime spies
People of Sengoku-period Japan